Bangladesh Itihas Parisad is a collective organization of historians and researchers in Bangladesh.

History
Bangladesh Itihas Parisad was formed in 1966. it was the first historical association of Bangladesh. The aim of the organization is the promotion of historical publications written in Bengali language. The organizations holds conferences and seminars on history in Bangladesh. It awards best published works of history in Bangladesh.

References

Research institutes in Bangladesh
1966 establishments in East Pakistan
Organisations based in Dhaka
Learned societies of Bangladesh